The Shenzhen Broadcasting Center Building is a 790-foot-tall (241 m) skyscraper in the city of Shenzhen, China. It has 48 floors and was completed in 2001.

See also
List of skyscrapers
List of buildings

Buildings and structures in Shenzhen